Penny Dreadful: City of Angels is an American historical dark fantasy television series created by John Logan that premiered on Showtime on April 26, 2020. The series stars Natalie Dormer, Daniel Zovatto, Kerry Bishé, Adriana Barraza, Jessica Garza, Michael Gladis, Johnathan Nieves, Rory Kinnear, and Nathan Lane. The series follows two detectives (Zovatto and Lane) as they investigate a murder in Los Angeles. A spin-off of the series Penny Dreadful, City of Angels was ordered in November 2018 and is set in Los Angeles, California, in 1938.

The first season concluded on June 28, 2020; the series was canceled in August 2020. Dormer was nominated for Best Actress in a Horror Series at the 1st Critics' Choice Super Awards for her performance.

Premise
Penny Dreadful: City of Angels is set nearly 50 years after the original series, during the Golden Age of Hollywood in the 1930s. It takes place in 1938 Los Angeles, a time and place "deeply infused with Mexican-American folklore and social tension". The characters are connected in a conflict between the Mexican folklore deity, Santa Muerte, the caretaker of the dead and guide to the great beyond, and her spiritual sister, the demoness Magda, who believes mankind is inherently evil and aims to prove her point. Detective Tiago Vega and his partner, veteran Detective Lewis Michener, are tasked with a gruesome murder case and soon become embroiled in Los Angeles's history as well as its present, while racial tensions, the looming threat of war, and Nazi conspiracies threaten to derail them at every turn.

Cast

Main
Natalie Dormer as Magda, a demon who can take various forms. Magda's personas include:
Alex Malone (born Mahler), City Councilman Townsend's political aide with an alleged secret past as a German Jew who pushes him to collaborate with the Nazis.
Elsa Branson, a German housewife who seduces Peter Craft. Her son Frank is also one of Magda's personas.
Rio, an influential member of the pachuco gang in Los Angeles who begins a polyamorous relationship with Fly Rico and Mateo.
Daniel Zovatto as Tiago Vega, the first Mexican-American detective of the Los Angeles Police Department (LAPD). Guest actor Evan Whitten portrays Tiago as a child.
Kerry Bishé as Molly Finnister, a charismatic radio evangelist who is known as "Sister Molly"
Adriana Barraza as Maria Vega, the matriarch of the Vega family
Jessica Garza as Josefina Vega, the youngest child of the Vega family
Michael Gladis as Charlton Townsend, a councilman and head of the Los Angeles City Council's Transportation Committee
Johnathan Nieves as Mateo Vega, Tiago's younger brother
Rory Kinnear as Peter Craft (born Krupp), a German pediatrician and the head of the local German-American Bund. Craft's true background is the German family Krupp, famous for their production of weapons.
Nathan Lane as Lewis Michener, a veteran LAPD officer and Vega's partner

Recurring

Santino Barnard as Frank Branson, Elsa's son who is also one of Magda's personas
Sebastian Chacon as Fly Rico, a dashing pachuco and a friend of Mateo's
Christine Estabrook as Beverly Beck, a member of the Los Angeles City Council who despises Townsend
Julian Hilliard as Tom Craft, Peter's son
Lorenza Izzo as Santa Muerte, a deity associated with healing, protection, and safe delivery to the afterlife by her devotees
Rod McLachlan as Jimmy Reilly, a racist, sadistic LAPD officer who routinely assaults Mexican-American citizens
Ethan Peck as Hermann Ackermann, second-in-command of the German-American Bund
Piper Perabo as Linda Craft, Peter's wife
Adan Rocha as Diego Lopez, a pachuco
Adam Rodriguez as Raul Vega, Tiago's older brother
Dominic Sherwood as Kurt, Richard Goss's chauffeur who starts dating Townsend on Goss's orders
Brent Spiner as Ned Vanderhoff, an LAPD captain and Vega and Michener's boss
Hudson West as Trevor Craft, Peter's son
Thomas Kretschmann as Richard Goss, a German architect and an operative of the Third Reich
Stephanie Arcila as Bernadette Romero, a pachuco
Scott Beehner as Frank Murphy, a detective
Kyle McArthur as Brian Koenig, an intelligent student working for the Nazis to design a better V2 rocket engine
Lin Shaye as Dottie Minter, a friend to Michener
Amy Madigan as Adelaide Finnister, Molly's mother and manager
Brad Garrett as Benny Berman, a Jewish mobster from New York City who works with Meyer Lansky

Guest
Holger Moncada Jr. as Jose Vega, Tiago's father
Richard Kind as Sam Bloom, a friend of Lewis's
Bill Smitrovich as Anton Chevic, a friend of Lewis's
Patti LuPone as a vocalist, singing at a secret gay club
Brian Dennehy as Jerome Townsend, Charlton's father

Episodes

Production
Filming began in August 2019 in Los Angeles. Paco Cabezas directed the first and second episodes after previously directing four episodes, including the series finale, of Penny Dreadful. On January 13, 2020, it was announced that the series would premiere on April 26, 2020. On August 21, 2020, Showtime canceled the series after one season.

Reception

Critical response
On Rotten Tomatoes, the series has an approval rating of 75% based on 32 reviews, with an average rating of 6.84/10. The website's critical consensus is, "Though City of Angels host of interesting characters would be better served if there were fewer of them, twisty plotting and superb performances are bound to satisfy Penny Dreadful devotees." On Metacritic, it has a weighted average score of 60 out of 100, based on 16 critics, indicating "mixed or average reviews".

Danette Chavez of The A.V. Club gave the season a mixed review, writing that the show was ineffective across the genres it tried to portray. "Specificity," wrote Chavez, "along with cohesion, was missing all season. The maps that inspired City of Angels offered [producer John Logan] a way in, but not a clear path through this hodgepodge of genres and topics."

Ratings

Notes

References

External links 
 
 

2020s American drama television series
2020s American horror television series
2020 American television series debuts
2020 American television series endings
American television spin-offs
American horror fiction television series
Dark fantasy television series
Demons in television
Fratricide in fiction
Horror drama television series
English-language television shows
Television shows written by John Logan
Serial drama television series
Showtime (TV network) original programming
Television series set in the 1930s
Television shows set in Los Angeles
Polyamory in fiction